Transformers: Galaxies is an anthology comic book series by IDW Publishing. It is a spin-off to 2019's Transformers comic book, featuring various stories about many other characters outside the main storyline.

The series began on September 25, 2019 and concluded on December 30, 2020.

Premise 
Transformers: Galaxies is set parallelly to the events of the 2019 Transformers series, with several characters being affected by the incoming war between Autobots and Decepticons.

Publication history

Background 
Transformers was first announced by IDW Publishing on December 18, 2018. The title is written by Brian Ruckley, and was initially illustrated by Angel Hernandez and Cachét Whitman, and started publishing issues twice-monthly in March 2019. Ruckley described the writing opportunity as a "privilege", and stated that the title would be a great opportunity for new readers to familiarize themselves with the universe and characters of the Transformers franchise, which he describes as of the "biggest [and] best that science fiction has to offer".

Development 
Transformers: Galaxies was firstly announced in June 2019, with the first story arc based on the Constructicons, and is set to be written by Vox Media co-founder Tyler Bleszinski, with art by Livio Ramondelli, and is set to be released in September 2019.

Bleszinski says he has "dreamed of the day that I could somehow be involved in the Transformers universe. Humanizing the Constructicons in a refreshed origin story with Livio Ramondelli – one of the most talented Transformers artists ever – will be one of the highlights of my life and will give me the opportunity to share my passion for these incredible creations with my kids’ generation. This is truly a dream come true." According to IDW Editor David Mariotte, "Transformers: Galaxies delves into what's happening away from Cybertron. Tyler and Livio are working on a story about broken promises and lost futures — about those who fall by the wayside to maintain a utopia."

During San Diego Comic-Con on July 18, 2019, IDW announced three other story arcs: the second arc starring Cliffjumper, the third arc starring Arcee and Greenlight, and the fourth and final arc starring Ultra Magnus.

The series ended on December 30, 2020 after twelve issues.

Issues

Reception

Collected editions

References

Notes

Footnotes

External links 

IDW Publishing titles
2019 comics debuts
2020 comics endings
Galaxies
Comic books suspended due to the COVID-19 pandemic